The 181 Union City-New York is a bus route operated by New Jersey Transit in the U.S. states of New Jersey and New York. Buses head north from the Bergenline Avenue Hudson-Bergen Light Rail station in Union City along Bergenline Avenue, Woodcliff Avenue, and Palisade Avenue (Hudson Palisades) to Fort Lee via West New York, Guttenberg, North Bergen, Fairview, and Cliffside Park, and cross the George Washington Bridge to the George Washington Bridge Bus Station in Upper Manhattan.

History
The route continued to operate along the old streetcar route to Hoboken Terminal until April 8, 2006, about 1.5 months after the Bergenline Avenue station of the Hudson-Bergen Light Rail opened. In order to "take advantage of the light rail system's reliability and convenience", the 181 was truncated to the station, where passengers can transfer to the light rail line or to the 89 (which was rerouted along the old 181 route) to reach Hoboken.

References
New Jersey Transit,  

181
New Jersey streetcar lines
Bus 181